The UNCAF U-17 Interclub Cup, is an annual international football competition open for domestic clubs under the age of 17 organized by UNCAF since 2018.  In the present format, the tournament consists of two stages, the first stage consist of two groups of four and three teams.  The winners and runners-up of each group enter the knockout stage, which consist of a semifinal round and a final.

Editions

See also
 UNCAF Interclub Cup
 UNCAF Women's Interclub Championship

References

External links
 UNCAF Website

Under 17
Recurring sporting events established in 2018